John Boulcott may refer to:
 John Ellerker Boulcott (1784–1855), London merchant and shipowner
 John Roberts Boulcott (1826–1915), English organist and inventor